Sacred Heart Medical Center may refer to:

In the United States:
 Sacred Heart Medical Center at RiverBend, Springfield, Oregon
 Sacred Heart Medical Center University District, Eugene, Oregon
 Providence Sacred Heart Medical Center and Children's Hospital, Spokane, Washington

See also
Sacred Heart Hospital (disambiguation)